A  (also known as melon pan, melon bun or melon bread) is a type of sweet bun originating from and popular in Japan, as well as in Taiwan and China. They are made from an enriched dough covered in a thin layer of crisp cookie dough. Their appearance resembles a melon, such as a rock melon (cantaloupe). They are not traditionally melon flavored, but in recent times it has become popular for manufacturers to add melon flavoring to melon bread. Variations exist, including some with a few chocolate chips between the cookie layer and the enriched dough layer, and non-melon versions flavored with caramel, maple syrup, chocolate, or other flavors, sometimes with syrup, whipped or flavored cream, or custard as a filling. In the case of such variations, the name may drop the word "melon", instead replacing it with the name of the contents (such as "maple pan" for a maple syrup flavored bread) or may keep it despite the lack of melon flavor (such as "chocolate melon pan").

The name has a dual etymology, since "melon" is a loan word from English, while  is from the Portuguese word for bread.

In parts of the Kansai, Chūgoku, and Shikoku regions, a variation with a radiating line pattern is called "sunrise", and many residents of these regions call even the cross-hatched melon pan "sunrise".

Melonpan and pineapple bun from Hong Kong are very similar. By comparison, the Japanese style is lighter in weight and taste, slightly drier and has a firmer outer layer (including top cookie crust) which resists flaking, unlike its Hong Kong counterpart, whose top cookie crust tends to flake easily. The Hong Kong version is also moister, and is generally soft on the outside and inside, with a stronger butter flavour.

History 
After World War I, Okura Kihachiro brought an Armenian baker, Hovhannes Ghevenian, also known as Ivan Sagoyan, to Tokyo. Sagoyan worked at the Imperial Hotel in Tokyo and invented melonpan.

Gallery

See also

 Conchas
 Pineapple bun
 Soboro bread
 List of buns

References

External links
 Melon Pan Recipe

Buns
Japanese breads
Japanese desserts and sweets
Sweet breads
Yeast breads